Benjamin Ralph Kimlau (金勞少尉) (April 11, 1918 – March 5, 1944) was a Chinese American aviator and United States Air Force bomber pilot.

Kimlau was born on April 10, 1918 in Concord, MA and moved to New York City with his parents in 1932. He attended DeWitt Clinton High School. After his visit to China, he studied at Pennsylvania Military College in Chester, Pennsylvania from 1938 to 1942. Upon graduation he was promoted to Field Artillery 2nd Lieutenant. With America at war, Kimlau joined the US Army Field Artillery, but later transferred to the United States Army Air Forces 380th Bombardment Group of the Fifth Air Force. After training as a pilot, he was stationed at Fenton Airfield in Australia. In Australia, Kimlau flew B-24 Liberator bomber in missions during the New Guinea campaign. On March 5, 1944, Kimlau's bomber was attacked by the Japanese and crashed near Los Negros Island.

His bomber group was given 2 Presidential Unit Citations.

Honors
Kimlau has been honored by American Legion 1291, which named their post after him. In 1962, the Benjamin Ralph Kimlau Memorial Gate (金勞紀念牌坊) was erected at Kimlau Square within Chatham Square in his memory. The New York City Landmarks Preservation Commission designated the Kimlau War Memorial as a landmark in June 2021.

See also
 Arthur Chin
 Francis B. Wai

References

1918 births
1944 deaths
United States Army Air Forces officers
American military personnel of Chinese descent
People from Concord, Massachusetts
Military personnel from New York City
Widener University alumni
United States Army Air Forces bomber pilots of World War II
United States Army officers
United States Army Air Forces personnel killed in World War II
DeWitt Clinton High School alumni
Aviators killed by being shot down
United States Army personnel of World War II
Military personnel from Massachusetts